Hemant Khandelwal (born 3 September 1964) was a member of the 14th Lok Sabha of India. He represented the Betul constituency of Madhya Pradesh and is a member of the Bharatiya Janata Party (BJP) political party. He was elected as MP from Betul in by-elections in 2008 after the death of his father and MP Vijay Kumar Khandelwal.>

He has studied law and is a businessman by profession. He has 1 daughter, named Surabhi Khandelwal, and 1 son named Varad Khandelwal.

References

External links
 Members of Fourteenth Lok Sabha - Parliament of India website

1964 births
India MPs 2004–2009
Bharatiya Janata Party politicians from Madhya Pradesh
People from Betul, Madhya Pradesh
People from Mathura
Living people
Lok Sabha members from Madhya Pradesh